Engone is a surname. Notable people with the surname include:

Basile Mvé Engone (born 1941), Gabonese Roman Catholic archbishop
Jean Engone (born 1932), Gabonese politician